John Frederick O'Hanlon (4 November 1872 – 22 December 1956) was an Irish politician and journalist. He stood unsuccessfully as a Farmers' Party candidate at the Cavan by-election on 11 March 1925. He was first elected to Dáil Éireann as an independent Teachta Dála (TD) for the Cavan constituency at the June 1927 general election. He was re-elected at the September 1927 and 1932 general elections. He contested the 1933 general election as a National Centre Party candidate but did not retain his seat.

References

1872 births
1956 deaths
Independent TDs
Members of the 5th Dáil
Members of the 6th Dáil
Members of the 7th Dáil
Politicians from County Cavan
Farmers' Party (Ireland) politicians
National Centre Party (Ireland) politicians